The number e was introduced by Jacob Bernoulli in 1683. More than half a century later, Euler, who had been a student of Jacob's younger brother Johann, proved that e is irrational; that is, that it cannot be expressed as the quotient of two integers.

Euler's proof
Euler wrote the first proof of the fact that e is irrational in 1737 (but the text was only published seven years later). He computed the representation of e as a simple continued fraction, which is

Since this continued fraction is infinite and every rational number has a terminating continued fraction, e is irrational. A short proof of the previous equality is known. Since the simple continued fraction of e is not periodic, this also proves that e is not a root of a quadratic polynomial with rational coefficients; in particular, e2 is irrational.

Fourier's proof
The most well-known proof is Joseph Fourier's proof by contradiction, which is based upon the equality

 

Initially e is assumed to be a rational number of the form . The idea is to then analyze the scaled-up difference (here denoted x) between the series representation of e and its strictly smaller  partial sum, which approximates the limiting value e. By choosing the scale factor to be the factorial of b, the fraction  and the  partial sum are turned into integers, hence x must be a positive integer. However, the fast convergence of the series representation implies that x is still strictly smaller than 1. From this contradiction we deduce that e is irrational.

Now for the details. If e is a rational number, there exist positive integers a and b such that . Define the number

 

Use the assumption that e =  to obtain

 

The first term is an integer, and every fraction in the sum is actually an integer because  for each term. Therefore, under the assumption that e is rational, x is an integer.

We now prove that . First, to prove that x is strictly positive, we insert the above series representation of e into the definition of x and obtain

 

because all the terms are strictly positive.

We now prove that . For all terms with  we have the upper estimate

 

This inequality is strict for every .

Since there is no integer strictly between 0 and 1, we have reached a contradiction, and so e is irrational, Q.E.D.

Alternate proofs
Another proof can be obtained from the previous one by noting that

 

and this inequality is equivalent to the assertion that bx < 1. This is impossible, of course, since b and x are positive integers.

Still another proof can be obtained from the fact that

 

Define  as follows:

 

Then

 

which implies

  

for any positive integer .

Note that  is always an integer. Assume that  is rational, so  where  are co-prime, and  It is possible to appropriately choose  so that  is an integer, i.e. But from the above inequality, that is not possible. So,  is irrational. This means that  is irrational.

Generalizations
In 1840, Liouville published a proof of the fact that e2 is irrational followed by a proof that e2 is not a root of a second-degree polynomial with rational coefficients. This last fact implies that e4 is irrational. His proofs are similar to Fourier's proof of the irrationality of e. In 1891, Hurwitz explained how it is possible to prove along the same line of ideas that e is not a root of a third-degree polynomial with rational coefficients, which implies that e3 is irrational. More generally, eq is irrational for any non-zero rational q.

See also
 Characterizations of the exponential function
 Transcendental number, including a proof that e is transcendental
 Lindemann–Weierstrass theorem
 Proof that π is irrational

References

Diophantine approximation
Exponentials
Article proofs
E (mathematical constant)
Irrational numbers